The 2012-2013 Teledünya Turkish Women's Volleyball Cup was the 15th edition of Turkish Women's Volleyball Cup. It was held between October 6, 2012 and February 24, 2013. Vakıfbank won the cup defeating the title defender Eczacıbaşı VitrA with 3-0 in the final, and captured the title for the first time again after 15 years.

Round 1
24 teams were drawn to 6 pools of 4 teams each. The 1st and 2nd ranked qualified for Round 2. The remaining 3rd placed and all 4th placed teams were eliminated.

Group A

|}

|}

Group B

|}

|}

Group C

|}

|}

Group D

|}

|}

Round 2
The only match played in this round

|}

Quarterfinals
All times are local time.
In case of a tie – 1 match won & 1 match lost and not depending on the final score of both matches – the teams play a Golden Set to determine which one qualified for the Final Round.

First leg

|}

Second leg

|}
1Karşıyaka won the golden set 15–11

Finals
Venue: Başkent Volleyball Hall, Ankara, Turkey,

|}

|}

References

Women's volleyball in Turkey
2012 in Turkish women's sport
2013 in Turkish women's sport
Volleyball competitions in Turkey